Positive is a property of positivity and may refer to:

Mathematics and science 
 Positive formula, a logical formula not containing negation
 Positive number, a number that is greater than 0
 Plus sign, the sign "+" used to indicate a positive number
 Positive operator, a type of linear operator in mathematics
 Positive result, a result that has been found significant in statistical hypothesis testing
 Positive test, a diagnostic test result that indicates some parameter being evaluated was present
 Positive charge, one of the two types of electrical charge
 Positive (electrical polarity), in electrical circuits
 Positive lens, in optics
 Positive (photography), a positive image, in which the color and luminance correlates directly with that in the depicted scene
 Positive sense, said of an RNA sequence that codes for a protein

Philosophy and humanities
 Affirmative (policy debate), the team which affirms the resolution
 Negative and positive rights, concerning the moral obligation of a person to do something for/to someone
 Positive economics, in economics, about predictions of behavior of economic actors, as opposed to the normative aspect
 Positive law,  man-made law (statutes) in contrast with natural law (derived from deities or morality)
 Positive liberty, the opportunity and ability to act to fulfill one's own potential
 Affirmative (linguistics), a property of a non-negated expression (the opposite of negative)
 Positive (linguistics), the form of an adjective or adverb on which comparative and superlative are formed with suffixes or the use of more or less
 Positive affectivity, the psychological capability to respond positively
 Positive psychology, a branch of psychology
 Positive statement, in economics and philosophy, a (possibly incorrect) factual statement about what is, as opposed to what should be (a normative statement)

Films and television 
 Positive (1990 film), a documentary film about AIDS and activism
 Positive (2007 film), a short film in Hindi on HIV and AIDS
 Positive (2008 film), a 2008 Malayalam language film directed by V. K. Prakash
 Positive (TV series), a Filipino drama series

Music 
 Positive, an album by American singer Peabo Bryson
 Positive, an album by Japanese producer Tofubeats
 Positive, the sixth EP by South Korean band Pentagon
 "Positive", a 1994 song by Baboon from Face Down in Turpentine
 "Positive", a 2011 song by Taio Cruz from TY.O
 "(Gotta Be) Positive", a song by Eddy Grant from Reparation
 Positive hardcore, a subgenre of hardcore punk
 Positive organ

Other uses 
 Positive sign, in western astrology, the supposedly extroverted personalities of the fire and air signs

See also
 HIV-positive people
 Negative (disambiguation)
 Negative (photography), as opposed to positive images used in such applications as slide projection or photo emulsion stencil-making
 Normative
 Optimism
 Positif (disambiguation)
 Positive action (disambiguation)
 Positivism (disambiguation)